Hargis is an unincorporated community in Johnson County, Kentucky, United States. It is located at an elevation of 915 feet (279 m). It is located in the ZIP Code Tabulation Area (ZCTA) for ZIP code 41238.

References

 

Unincorporated communities in Johnson County, Kentucky
Unincorporated communities in Kentucky